Rhodium(III) sulfide is the inorganic compound with the formula Rh2S3.  It is an insoluble black solid, prepared by the heating a mixture of elemental rhodium and sulfur.  Crystals can be grown by chemical vapor transport using bromine as the transporting agent.  The structure consists of octahedral and tetrahedral Rh and S centers, respectively.  No close Rh-Rh contacts are observed.  Rh2Se3 and Ir2S3 adopt the same structure as Rh2S3.

References

Sulfides
Rhodium(III) compounds